Lake Bugeac, also known as Lake Gârlița,  is a lake in Northern Dobruja, Romania. It is located in a calcareous depression near the Danube, the water exchange with the latter being regulated by a weir.

Because the lake is an overwintering region located on an important migration route for aquatic birds (the most important being the dalmatian pelican), lake Buceag and the surrounding area have been declared a nature reserve.

References

Lakes of Constanța County
Protected areas of Romania
Important Bird Areas of Romania